Rhamphogyne is a genus of plants in the tribe Astereae within the family Asteraceae.

This genus resembles plants from the related ragwort tribe (Senecioneae) in some respects.

Species
The only known species is Rhamphogyne rhynchocarpa, native to Rodrigues Island in the Indian Ocean, part of the Republic of Mauritius.
formerly included
see Lagenocypsela 
Rhamphogyne papuana J.Kost.	- Lagenocypsela papuana (J.Kost.) Swenson & K.Bremer

References

Astereae
Monotypic Asteraceae genera
Endemic flora of Rodrigues
Taxa named by Isaac Bayley Balfour
Taxa named by Spencer Le Marchant Moore